Modupe-Oreoluwa Oyeyemi Ola (born October 16, 1990), known by her stage name Mo'Cheddah (sometimes stylized as Mocheeda or Mocheddah), is a Nigerian rapper and singer. She released her debut studio album, Franchise Celebrity (2010), while signed to Knighthouse Entertainment. The album was preceded by the 2009 promotional single "If You Want Me". She parted ways with Knighthouse in February 2012 and established her own label, Cheddah Music.

Early life and education
Mo'Cheddah was born on 16 October 1990, in Lagos. She is the fourth daughter of five children, though her family roots are in Osun State. She completed her primary education at the University of Lagos Staff School in Yaba, Lagos and later enrolled at Our Lady of Apostles, Yaba where she would complete her secondary education. She is a creative arts graduate from the University of Lagos.

Career 
Mo'Cheddah started exploring her creative side at age 12. She was initially interested in acting, but later transitioned to singing. She signed a record deal with Rogba Arimoro, under his music label, Knighthouse Music. She later left and founded her own record label mocheddah music. she began working on her second album which was due to be released in 2016.

Mo'Cheddah also has a secondary career as a fashion designer.

Personal life
In May 2018, she married her long-time boyfriend, Prince Bukunyi Olateru-Olagbegi in a private ceremony in Lagos, Nigeria. As the wife of a Yoruba royal, she is entitled to make use of the honorific style Olori. The couple welcomed their first child in 2021.

Discography
Studio albums
Franchise Celebrity (2010)

Selected singles
"Survive"
"My Time"
"Destinambari (featuring Phyno)
"Tori Olorun"
"Bad"
"Coming for You" (featuring May D)

Awards and nominations

Videography

References

External links
Mocheeda Biography on MTV Base

1990 births
Living people
University of Lagos alumni
Nigerian women rappers
Rappers from Lagos
Nigerian hip hop singers
Yoruba women musicians
21st-century Nigerian women  singers
Women hip hop musicians
Yoruba princesses
Princesses by marriage